Louisa County Courthouse may refer to:

Louisa County Courthouse (Iowa)
Louisa County Courthouse (Virginia)